The 2010–11 Eastern Counties Football League season was the 69th in the history of Eastern Counties Football League a football competition in England.

Premier Division

The Premier Division featured 19 clubs which competed in the division last season, along with three new clubs, promoted from Division One:
Brantham Athletic
Clacton
Great Yarmouth Town

League table

Division One

Division One featured 16 clubs which competed in the division last season, along with one new club:
Cambridge University Press, joined from the Cambridgeshire League

League table

References

External links
 Eastern Counties Football League

2010-11
9